Richard John Ross (9 September 1911 – 21 February 1996) was an Australian rules footballer who played with Collingwood in the Victorian Football League (VFL).

Ross was a utility player who was used mostly at half back. He appeared in five successive Grand Finals from 1935 to 1939, the first two of them premierships. His brother Bob also played at Collingwood.

Ross later served in the Royal Australian Air Force for six months during World War II.

References

External links

1911 births
Australian rules footballers from Victoria (Australia)
Collingwood Football Club players
Collingwood Football Club Premiership players
Northcote Football Club players
1996 deaths
Two-time VFL/AFL Premiership players